Euchionellus zanzibaricus is a species of beetle in the family Latridiidae, the only species in the genus Euchionellus.

References

Monotypic Cucujiformia genera
Latridiidae genera